Charles William Caldwell (August 2, 1901 – November 1, 1957) was an American football, basketball, and baseball player and coach.  He served as the head football coach at Williams College for 15 seasons between 1928 and 1944 and at Princeton University from 1945 to 1956, compiling a career college football record of 146–67–9. Caldwell was also the head basketball coach at Williams for ten seasons (1929–1939), tallying a mark of 78–66, and the head baseball coach at Williams (1931–1944) and Princeton (1945–1946), achieving a career college baseball record of 118–96.  He was inducted into the College Football Hall of Fame as a coach in 1961.

Early life and playing career
Caldwell was born in Bristol, Virginia on August 2, 1901. He attended Princeton University, where he played football, basketball, and baseball. In three career games, he had a 0–0 record, with a 16.88 ERA. He batted and threw right-handed.

Coaching career
Caldwell coached three sports at Williams College.  His record there was 76–37–6 in football, 78–66 in basketball, and 100–74 in baseball.  Caldwell died in Princeton, New Jersey on November 1, 1957.

Head coaching record

Football

References

External links
 

 

1901 births
1957 deaths
American men's basketball players
Guards (basketball)
Major League Baseball pitchers
New York Yankees players
Princeton Tigers baseball coaches
Princeton Tigers baseball players
Princeton Tigers football coaches
Princeton Tigers football players
Princeton Tigers men's basketball players
Williams Ephs baseball coaches
Williams Ephs football coaches
Williams Ephs men's basketball coaches
College Football Hall of Fame inductees
People from Bristol, Virginia
Coaches of American football from Virginia
Players of American football from Virginia
Baseball players from Virginia
Basketball coaches from Virginia
Basketball players from Virginia